Kahshur-e Olya (also Romanized as Kahshūr-e ‘Olyā; also known as Kahshūr-e Bālā) is a village in Howmeh-ye Sharqi Rural District, in the Central District of Izeh County, Khuzestan Province, Iran. At the 2006 census, its population was 27, in 7 families.

References 

Populated places in Izeh County